Alma or ALMA may refer to:

Arts and entertainment

 Alma (film), a 2009 Spanish short animated film
 Alma (Oswald de Andrade novel), 1922
 Alma (Le Clézio novel), 2017
 Alma (play), a 1996 drama by Joshua Sobol about Alma Mahler-Werfel
 Alma (album), by Carminho, 2012
 "Alma" (song), by Fonseca, 2008
 "Alma", a song by Tom Lehrer from the 1965 album That Was the Year That Was 
 ALMA Award, or American Latino Media Arts Award

Businesses
 Alma Books, a British publishing house
 Alma Media, a Finnish digital service business
 ALMA de México, a low-cost airline

Military
 Battle of the Alma, an 1854 Crimean War battle
 Alma-class ironclad, French Navy corvettes built in the 1860s
 French ironclad Alma

People and fictional characters
 Alma (given name), including a list of people, fictional characters and Mormon religious figures with the name
 Alma (Finnish singer) (Alma-Sofia Miettinen, born 1996)
 Alma (French singer) (Alexandra Maquet, born 1988)

Places

Australia 
 Alma, South Australia
 Alma, Victoria
 Alma, Western Australia
 South Broken Hill, New South Wales, formerly known as Alma
 Electoral district of Alma

Canada 
 Alma Parish, New Brunswick
 Alma, New Brunswick, a fishing village
 Alma, Nova Scotia
 Alma, Ontario
 Alma, Prince Edward Island
 Alma, Quebec

United States 
 Alma, Alabama
 Alma, Arkansas
 Alma, California
 Alma, Colorado
 Alma, Georgia
 Alma, Illinois
 Alma Township, Marion County, Illinois
 Alma, Kansas
 Alma, Louisiana
 Alma, Michigan
 Alma Township, Marshall County, Minnesota
 Alma, Missouri
 Alma, Nebraska
 Alma Township, Harlan County, Nebraska
 Alma, New Mexico
 Alma, New York
 Alma, Ohio
 Alma, Oklahoma
 Alma, Oregon
 Alma, Texas
 Alma, Virginia
 Alma, Wisconsin, a city
 Alma, Buffalo County, Wisconsin, a town
 Alma, Jackson County, Wisconsin, a town

Elsewhere 
 Alma (Algeria), former name of Boudouaou
 Alma, Greece
 Alma, Iran
 Alma, Israel
 Alma, Kyrgyzstan
 Alma, Lebanon
 Alma, Bukit Mertajam, Penang, Malaysia
 Alma, Safad, Mandatory Palestine, a depopulated Palestinian village 
 Alma, Sibiu, Romania
 Alma, Limpopo, South Africa
 Alma River (disambiguation)
 390 Alma, an asteroid

Schools 
 UCLouvain Brussels Woluwe, in Brussels, Belgium, known as Alma, a campus of the University of Louvain in Brussels, Belgium
 Alma College (St. Thomas, Ontario), Canada, a ladies liberal arts college 1877–1994
 Alma College, in Alma, Michigan, U.S., a liberal arts college
 Jesuit School of Theology of Santa Clara University, in Berkeley, California, U.S., founded as Alma College
 Collège d'Alma, Alma, Quebec, Canada
 Alma High School (disambiguation)

Transportation 
 Alma (1891), a scow schooner
 , a passenger ship
 Alma (French automobile), manufactured 1926–1929
 Alma metro station in Brussels, Belgium
 Alma Airport, Alma, Quebec, Canada
 Alma (Rivière La Grande Décharge) Water Aerodrome, Alma, Quebec
 Pont de l'Alma ('Alma Bridge'), Paris, France

Acronyms 
 Armenian Library and Museum of America, Watertown, Massachusetts, United States
 Asian land mammal age, a geologic timescale for prehistoric Asian fauna
 Atacama Large Millimeter Array, a telescope in Chile

Other uses 
 Book of Alma, one of the books that make up the Book of Mormon
 Alma Generating Station, a power station in Wisconsin, United States
 Hurricane Alma, the name of several storms
 ALMA Magazine, an American Spanish-language lifestyle magazine
 Almah or alma, a Hebrew word for a young woman of childbearing age
 AlmaLinux, a Linux distribution

See also 

 Alma Bay, Queensland, Australia
 Port Alma, Queensland, Australia
 Alma Depot, Alma, Georgia, United States, a historic site
 Alma City, Minnesota, United States, an unincorporated community
 Alma Center, Wisconsin, United States, a village
 Alma School/Main Street station, a station on the Metro light rail line in Mesa, Arizona, U.S.
 Alma – Marceau (Paris Métro), a station in Paris, France
 Almas (disambiguation)
 Almah (disambiguation)
 Alma mater (disambiguation)
 Alma Park (disambiguation)
 Alma-0, a programming language
 Almaty, formerly Alma-Ata, the largest city in Kazakhstan